The So Cal Scorpions were a semi-pro women's American football team based in San Diego, California.  In 2011, they played in the Women's Football Alliance after five seasons in the defunct Women's Professional Football League, The ownership brought the team to a spring league. Independent Women's Football League.  Home games were most recently played at Balboa Stadium.

History
In 2003 the So Cal Scorpions began their inaugural season in the city of Temecula, in Riverside County, as the first professional sports team in this city and county. They moved to the city of San Diego in 2004, where other professional sports teams are based.

In 2007, the SoCal Scorpions unveiled a new spread, no huddle offense similar to the one run by several Division I Colleges under 32 year old rookie head coach Dan Tovar.  The So Cal Scorpions were winners of the National Championship in the WPFL for the 2007 season largely behind this new pro style offense and the return of their already stellar defense.  The Scorpions entered the playoffs as the final seed in their division after compiling a 6–2 record.  Two of their six victories were over the three-time defending champion Dallas Diamonds who had previously only lost one game in a four-year span.  Those two wins kept the defending champs from even entering the playoffs.  Much like the NFL Super Bowl Champion Giants, the Scorpions were true road warriors, going undefeated on the road in the regular season, and traveled to Los Angeles and New York for their playoff victories.

En route to their Championship, several Scorpion players excelled and shattered league records.  QB Melissa Gallegos threw for over 1,700 yards and 20 touchdowns, she also ran for over 100 yards and 4 rushing touchdowns.  Rookie Sensation Brittney Cotton led the WR corps with almost 700 yards receiving joining Scorpion veterans Isis Wagner, Elizabeth Quintard and Theresa Smith on the WPFL All Pro Team.  RB Des Weimann rushed for over 1,600 yards and 12 touchdowns and was the winner of the League MVP award. She scored the first touchdown in SoCal's 14-7 Championship victory over the Houston Energy.

The offense was anchored on the O-Line by ALL Stars Katrina Walter, Lela Vaeao, Lindsay Hood, Christina Carrillo, and first year left guard Hawa Wiley-Ross. This unit gave up less than 10 sacks on the season for an offense that threw the ball 60% of the time.  Defensively, the Scorpions were led by Deuce Reyes who recorded 17 INT's on the season and by Defensive Ends Cilena Mosley and Crystal Stokes who together recorded over 24 sacks on the season.  Defensive Tackle Michelle Starks earned her first All Pro spot joining veteran Joniece Edwards.  Team Captain Andrea Hubbard made the switch from Defensive End to Linebacker and still earned an All Pro bid along with first time All-Pros, Tarrah Philpott and Wendy Hanlon.  Priscilla Flores and Kalilah Lawson rounded out So Cal's record 22 players on the All Pro team.

The Championship So Cal Scorpions were also represented when ESPN Commentator/Author Rick Reilly visited the team and featured them in his book Sports From Hell.

In their first season in the IWFL in 2010, the Scorpions finished 6–2, good enough for another playoff berth.  However, for the first time in their history they finished the postseason "one-and-done," losing to the Sacramento Sirens 60–26.

For their inaugural season in the WFA, the Scorpions won only two games (both against intra-city rivals the San Diego Sting).  However, the Scorpions would fold mid-season, with their final official record being 2–6.  A new San Diego women's team emerged in 2011 with the establishment of the San Diego Surge

Season-By-Season 

|-
| colspan="6" align="center" | So Cal Scorpions (WPFL)
|-
|2003 || 4 || 6 || 0 || 4th American West || --
|-
|2004 || 1 || 9 || 0 || 4th American West || --
|-
|2005 || 9 || 1 || 0 || 1st American West || Won American Conference Semifinal (Los Angeles)Lost American Conference Championship (Dallas)
|-
|2006 || 6 || 2 || 0 || 2nd American West || Won American Conference Semifinal (New England)Lost American Conference Championship (Dallas)
|-
|2007 || 6 || 2 || 0 || 2nd American West || Won American Conference Semifinal (Los Angeles)Won American Conference Championship (Empire State)Won WPFL Championship (Houston)
|-
|2008 || colspan="6" rowspan="2" align="center" | Did Not Play|-
|2009
|-
| colspan="6" align="center" | So Cal Scorpions (IWFL)|-
|2010 || 6 || 2 || 0 || 2nd Tier I West Pacific West || Lost Pacific West Division Championship (Sacramento)
|-
| colspan="6" align="center" | So Cal Scorpions (WFA)'''
|-
|2011 || 2 || 6 || 0 || 3rd American Southwest || --
|-
!Totals || 39 || 31 || 0
|colspan="2"| (including playoffs)

Roster

2010

Season Schedule 2007

Season Schedule 2010

2011

Standings

Season Schedule

** = Forfeited

External links
So Cal Scorpions website
WFA website

American football teams in San Diego
Women's Football Alliance teams
Temecula, California
American football teams established in 2003
American football teams disestablished in 2011
2003 establishments in California
2011 disestablishments in California
Women's sports in California